Nimrud is an ancient Assyrian city (original Assyrian name Kalhu, biblical name Calah) located in Iraq,  south of the city of Mosul, and  south of the village of Selamiyah, in the Nineveh Plains in Upper Mesopotamia. It was a major Assyrian city between approximately 1350 BC and 610 BC. The ruins of the city were found within  of the modern-day Assyrian village of Noomanea in Nineveh Governorate, Iraq.

The name Nimrud was recorded as the local name by Carsten Niebuhr in the mid-18th century. In the mid 19th century, biblical archaeologists proposed the Biblical name of Kalhu (the Biblical Calah), based on a description of the travels of Nimrod in Genesis 10.

Archaeological excavations at the site began in 1845, and were conducted at intervals between then and 1879, and then from 1949 onwards. Many important pieces were discovered, with most being moved to museums in Iraq and abroad. In 2013, the UK's Arts and Humanities Research Council funded the "Nimrud Project", directed by Eleanor Robson, whose aims were to write the history of the city in ancient and modern times, to identify and record the dispersal history of artefacts from Nimrud, distributed amongst at least 76 museums worldwide (including 36 in the United States and 13 in the United Kingdom).

In 2015, the terrorist organization Islamic State announced its intention to destroy the site because of its "un-Islamic" Assyrian nature. In March 2015, the Iraqi government reported that Islamic State had used bulldozers to destroy excavated remains of the city. Several videos released by ISIL showed the work in progress. In November 2016, Iraqi forces retook the site, and later visitors also confirmed that around 90% of the excavated portion of city had been completely destroyed. The ruins of Nimrud have remained guarded by Iraqi forces ever since. Reconstruction work is in progress.

Early history

Foundation
The Assyrian king Shalmaneser I (1274–1245 BC) built up Kalhu (Nimrod) into a major city during the Middle Assyrian Empire (1365–1050 BC), rather than the fictional biblical king Nimrod. However, the ancient city of Assur remained the capital of Assyria, as it had been since c. 2600 BC.

Capital of the Empire
The city gained fame when king Ashurnasirpal II (883–859 BC) of the Neo-Assyrian Empire (911–605 BC) made it his capital at the expense of Assur. He built a large palace and temples in the city, which had fallen into a degree of disrepair during the Bronze Age Collapse of the mid-11th to mid-10th centuries BC. Thousands of men worked to build an  wall surrounding the city and a grand palace. There were many inscriptions carved into limestone including one that said: "The palace of cedar, cypress, juniper, boxwood, mulberry, pistachio wood, and tamarisk, for my royal dwelling and for my lordly pleasure for all time, I founded therein. Beasts of the mountains and of the seas, of white limestone and alabaster I fashioned and set them up on its gates." The inscriptions also described plunder stored at the palace: "Silver, gold, lead, copper and iron, the spoil of my hand from the lands which I had brought under my sway, in great quantities I took and placed therein. The inscriptions also described great feasts he had to celebrate his conquests. However his victims were horrified by his conquests. The text also said: "Many of the captives I have taken and burned in a fire. Many I took alive; from some I cut off their hands to the wrists, from others I cut off their noses, ears and fingers; I put out the eyes of many of the soldiers. I burned their young men, women and children to death." About a conquest in another vanquished city he wrote: "I flayed the nobles as many as rebelled; and [I] spread their skins out on the piles." He wanted the city to become the grandest and luxuriant in the empire. He created a zoo and botanical gardens in the city which also featured exotic animals, trees and flowers he had brought back from his military campaigns.

A grand opening ceremony with festivities and an opulent banquet in 864 BC is described in an inscribed stele discovered during archeological excavations. By 800 BC Nimrud had grown to 75,000 inhabitants making it the largest city in the world.

King Ashurnasirpal's son Shalmaneser III (858–823 BC) continued where his father had left off. At Nimrud he built a palace that far surpassed his father's. He built the monument known as the Great Ziggurat, and an associated temple.

Nimrud remained the capital of the Assyrian Empire during the reigns of Shamshi-Adad V (822–811 BC), Adad-nirari III (810–782 BC), Queen Semiramis (810–806 BC), Adad-nirari III (806–782 BC), Shalmaneser IV (782–773 BC), Ashur-dan III (772–755 BC), Ashur-nirari V (754–746 BC), Tiglath-Pileser III (745–727 BC) and Shalmaneser V (726–723 BC). Tiglath-Pileser III in particular, conducted major building works in the city, as well as introducing Eastern Aramaic as the lingua franca of the empire, whose dialects still endure among the Christian Assyrians of the region today.

However, in 706 BC Sargon II (722–705 BC) moved the capital of the empire to Dur Sharrukin, and after his death, Sennacherib (705–681 BC) moved it to Nineveh. It remained a major city and a royal residence until the city was largely destroyed during the fall of the Assyrian Empire at the hands of an alliance of former subject peoples, including the Babylonians, Chaldeans, Medes, Persians, Scythians, and Cimmerians (between 616 BC and 599 BC).

Later geographical writings
Ruins of a similarly located Assyrian city named "Larissa" were described by Xenophon in his Anabasis in the 5th century BC.

A similar locality was described in the Middle Ages by a number of Arabic geographers including Yaqut al-Hamawi, Abu'l-Fida and Ibn Sa'id al-Maghribi, using the name "Athur" (meaning Assyria) near Selamiyah.

Archaeology

Early writings and debate over name

Nimrud
The name Nimrud in connection with the site in Western writings was first used in the travelogue of Carsten Niebuhr, who was in Mosul in March 1760. Niebuhr 

In 1830, traveller James Silk Buckingham wrote of "two heaps called Nimrod-Tuppé and Shah-Tuppé... The Nimrod-Tuppé has a tradition attached to it, of a palace having been built there by Nimrod".

However, the name became the cause of significant debate amongst Assyriologists in the mid-nineteenth century, with much of the discussion focusing on the identification of four Biblical cities mentioned in Genesis 10: "From that land he went to Assyria, where he built Nineveh, the city Rehoboth-Ir, Calah and Resen".

Larissa / Resen
The site was described in more detail by the British traveler Claudius James Rich in 1820, shortly before his death. Rich identified the site with the city of Larissa in Xenophon, and noted that the locals "generally believe this to have been Nimrod's own city; and one or two of the better informed with whom I conversed at Mousul said it was Al Athur or Ashur, from which the whole country was denominated."

The site of Nimrud was visited by William Francis Ainsworth in 1837. Ainsworth, like Rich, identified the site with Larissa (Λάρισσα) of Xenophon's Anabasis, concluding that Nimrud was the Biblical Resen on the basis of Bochart's identification of Larissa with Resen on etymological grounds.

Rehoboth
The site was subsequently visited by James Phillips Fletcher in 1843. Fletcher instead identified the site with Rehoboth on the basis that the city of Birtha described by Ptolemy and Ammianus Marcellinus has the same etymological meaning as Rehoboth in Hebrew.

Ashur
Sir Henry Rawlinson mentioned that the Arabic geographers referred to it as Athur. British traveler Claudius James Rich mentions, "one or two of the better informed with whom I conversed at Mosul said it was Al Athur or Ashur, from which the whole country was denominated."

Nineveh
Prior to 1850, Layard believed that the site of "Nimroud" was part of the wider region of "Nineveh" (the debate as to which excavation site represented the city of Nineveh had yet to be resolved), which also included the two mounds today identified as Nineveh-proper, and his excavation publications were thus labeled.

Calah
Henry Rawlinson identified the city with the Biblical Calah on the basis of a cuneiform reading of "Levekh" which he connected to the city following Ainsworth and Rich's connection of Xenophon's Larissa to the site.

Excavations

Initial excavations at Nimrud were conducted by Austen Henry Layard, working from 1845 to 1847 and from 1849 until 1851. Following Layard's departure, the work was handed over to Hormuzd Rassam in 1853-54 and then William Loftus in 1854–55.

After George Smith briefly worked the site in 1873 and Rassam returned there from 1877 to 1879, Nimrud was left untouched for almost 60 years.

A British School of Archaeology in Iraq team led by Max Mallowan resumed digging at Nimrud in 1949; these excavations resulted in the discovery of the 244 Nimrud Letters. The work continued until 1963 with David Oates becoming director in 1958 followed by Julian Orchard in 1963.

Subsequent work was by the Directorate of Antiquities of the Republic of Iraq (1956, 1959–60, 1969–78 and 1982–92), the Polish Centre of Mediterranean Archaeology University of Warsaw directed by Janusz Meuszyński (1974–76), Paolo Fiorina (1987–89) with the Centro Ricerche Archeologiche e Scavi di Torino who concentrated mainly on Fort Shalmaneser, and John Curtis (1989). In 1974 to his untimely death in 1976 Janusz Meuszyński, the director of the Polish project, with the permission of the Iraqi excavation team, had the whole site documented on film—in slide film and black-and-white print film. Every relief that remained in situ, as well as the fallen, broken pieces that were distributed in the rooms across the site were photographed. Meuszyński also arranged with the architect of his project, Richard P. Sobolewski, to survey the site and record it in plan and in elevation. As a result, the entire relief compositions were reconstructed, taking into account the presumed location of the fragments that were scattered around the world.

Excavations revealed remarkable bas-reliefs, ivories, and sculptures. A statue of Ashurnasirpal II was found in an excellent state of preservation, as were colossal winged man-headed lions weighing  to  each guarding the palace entrance. The large number of inscriptions dealing with king Ashurnasirpal II provide more details about him and his reign than are known for any other ruler of this epoch. The palaces of Ashurnasirpal II, Shalmaneser III, and Tiglath-Pileser III have been located. Portions of the site have been also been identified as temples to Ninurta and Enlil, a building assigned to Nabu, the god of writing and the arts, and as extensive fortifications.

In 1988, the Iraqi Department of Antiquities discovered four queens' tombs at the site.

Artworks

Nimrud has been one of the main sources of Assyrian sculpture, including the famous palace reliefs. Layard discovered more than half a dozen pairs of colossal guardian figures guarding palace entrances and doorways. These are lamassu, statues with a male human head, the body of a lion or bull, and wings. They have heads carved in the round, but the body at the side is in relief. In 1847 Layard brought two of the colossi weighing  each including one lion and one bull to London. After 18 months and several near disasters he succeeded in bringing them to the British Museum. This involved loading them onto a wheeled cart. They were lowered with a complex system of pulleys and levers operated by dozens of men. The cart was towed by 300 men. He initially tried to hook up the cart to a team of buffalo and have them haul it. However the buffalo refused to move. Then they were loaded onto a barge which required 600 goatskins and sheepskins to keep it afloat. After arriving in London a ramp was built to haul them up the steps and into the museum on rollers.

Additional  colossi were transported to Paris from Khorsabad by Paul Emile Botta in 1853. In 1928 Edward Chiera also transported a  colossus from Khorsabad to Chicago. The Metropolitan Museum of Art in New York has another pair.

The Statue of Ashurnasirpal II, Stela of Shamshi-Adad V and Stela of Ashurnasirpal II are large sculptures with portraits of these monarchs, all secured for the British Museum by Layard and the British archaeologist Hormuzd Rassam. Also in the British Museum is the famous Black Obelisk of Shalmaneser III, discovered by Layard in 1846. This stands six-and-a-half-feet tall and commemorates with inscriptions and 24 relief panels the king's victorious campaigns of 859–824 BC. It is shaped like a temple tower at the top, ending in three steps.

Series of the distinctive Assyrian shallow reliefs were removed from the palaces and sections are now found in several museums (see gallery below), in particular the British Museum. These show scenes of hunting, warfare, ritual and processions. The Nimrud Ivories are a large group of ivory carvings, probably mostly originally decorating furniture and other objects, that had been brought to Nimrud from several parts of the ancient Near East, and were in a palace storeroom and other locations. These are mainly in the British Museum and the National Museum of Iraq, as well as other museums. Another storeroom held the Nimrud Bowls, about 120 large bronze bowls or plates, also imported.

The "Treasure of Nimrud" unearthed in these excavations is a collection of 613 pieces of gold jewelry and precious stones. It has survived the confusions and looting after the invasion of Iraq in 2003 in a bank vault, where it had been put away for 12 years and was "rediscovered" on June 5, 2003.

Significant inscriptions
One panel of the Black Obelisk of Shalmaneser III has an inscription which includes the name mIa-ú-a mar mHu-um-ri-i Whilst Rawlinson originally translated this in 1850 as "Yahua, son of Hubiri", a year later reverend Edward Hincks, suggested it refers to king Jehu of Israel (2 Kings 9:2 ff. Whilst other interpretations exist, the obelisk is widely viewed by biblical archaeologists as therefore including the earliest known dedication of an Israelite. Note: all the kings of Israel were called "sons of Omri" by the Assyrians (mar means son).

A number of other artifacts considered important to Biblical history were excavated from the site, such as the Nimrud Tablet K.3751 and the Nimrud Slab. The bilingual Assyrian lion weights were important to scholarly deduction of the history of the alphabet.

Destruction

Nimrud's various monuments had faced threats from exposure to the harsh elements of the Iraqi climate. Lack of proper protective roofing meant that the ancient reliefs at the site were susceptible to erosion from wind-blown sand and strong seasonal rains.

In mid-2014, the Islamic State of Iraq and the Levant (ISIL) occupied the area surrounding Nimrud. ISIL destroyed other holy sites, including the Mosque of the Prophet Jonah in Mosul. In early 2015, they announced their intention to destroy many ancient artifacts, which they deemed idolatrous or otherwise un-Islamic; they subsequently destroyed thousands of books and manuscripts in Mosul's libraries. In February 2015, ISIL destroyed Akkadian monuments in the Mosul Museum, and on March 5, 2015, Iraq announced that ISIL militants had bulldozed Nimrud and its archaeological site on the basis that they were blasphemous.

A member of ISIL filmed the destruction, declaring, "These ruins that are behind me, they are idols and statues that people in the past used to worship instead of Allah. The Prophet Muhammad took down idols with his bare hands when he went into Mecca. We were ordered by our prophet to take down idols and destroy them, and the companions of the prophet did this after this time, when they conquered countries." ISIL declared an intention to destroy the restored city gates in Nineveh. ISIL went on to do demolition work at the later Parthian ruined city of Hatra. On April 12 2015, an on-line militant video purportedly showed ISIL militants hammering, bulldozing and ultimately using explosives to blow up parts of Nimrud.

Irina Bokova, the director general of UNESCO, stated "deliberate destruction of cultural heritage constitutes a war crime". The president of the Syriac League in Lebanon compared the losses at the site to the destruction of culture by the Mongol Empire. In November 2016, aerial photographs showed the systematic leveling of the Ziggurat by heavy machines. On 13 November 2016, the Iraqi Army recaptured the city from ISIL. The Joint Operations Command stated that it had raised the Iraqi flag above its buildings and also captured the Assyrian village of Numaniya, on the edge of the town. By the time Nimrud was retaken, around 90% of the excavated part of the city had been destroyed entirely. Every major structure had been damaged, the Ziggurat of Nimrud had been flattened, only a few scattered broken walls remained of the palace of Ashurnasirpal II, the Lamassu that once guarded its gates had been smashed and scattered across the landscape.

Reconstruction of the site 
A renovation program started in July 2017 with the support of UNESCO. The first phase included conducting studies of the damage caused to the site, assembling an Iraqi maintenance and rehabilitation team, preservation and archiving of the city's cultural heritage in co-operation with the American Smithsonian Institution. Phase 2 was launched in October 2019 with the goal to restore the northern palace.

As of 2020, archaeologists from the Nimrud Rescue Project have carried out two seasons of work at the site, training native Iraqi archaeologists on protecting heritage and helping preserve the remains. Plans for reconstruction and tourism are in the works but will likely not be implemented within the next decade. The first major excavation works, launched in mid-October 2022 by an excavation team from the University of Pennsylvania, reported the discovery of a door sill slab with inscriptions in December.

Security post Islamic State
Following the liberation from Islamic State, the security of the ancient city is run by the ethnic Assyrian security force Nineveh Plain Protection Units.

Gallery

See also

 Cities of the ancient Near East
 Hatra
 Islamic Iconoclasm
 Nimrud lens
 Short chronology timeline

Notes

Citations

General references
 Frankfort, Henri, The Art and Architecture of the Ancient Orient, Pelican History of Art, 4th ed 1970, Penguin (now Yale History of Art), 
 A. H. Layard, Nineveh and Its Remains, John Murray, 1849 (Vol. 1 and Vol. 2)

Further reading
 

 Barbara Parker, Seals and Seal Impressions from the Nimrud Excavations, Iraq, vol. 24, no. 1, pp. 26–40 1962
 Barbara Parker, "Nimrud Tablets, 1956: Economic and Legal Texts from the Nabu Temple", Iraq, vol. 19, no. 2, pp. 125–138, 1957
 D. J. Wiseman, "The Nabu Temple Texts from Nimrud", Journal of Near Eastern Studies, vol. 27, no. 3, pp. 248–250, 1968
 D. J. Wiseman, Fragments of Historical Texts from Nimrud, Iraq, vol. 26, no. 2, pp. 118–124, 1964
 A. H. Layard, Discoveries in the Ruins of Nineveh and Babylon, John Murray, 1853
 A. H. Layard, The monuments of Nineveh; from drawings made on the spot, John Murray, 1849
 Claudius James Rich, Narrative of a residence in Koordistan, and on the site of ancient Nineveh. Ed. by his widow, 1836
 James Phillips Fletcher,  Narrative of a Two Years' Residence at Nineveh, Volume 2, 1850
 Muzahim Mahmoud Hussein, Nimrud: The Queens' Tombs. 2016

External links

 Metropolitan Museum: Digital Reconstruction of the Northwest Palace, Nimrud, Assyria
 Nimrud/Calah
 Kalhu / Nimrud
 Centro Ricerche Archeologiche e Scavi di Torino excavation site
 Archaeological site photographs at Oriental Institute
 More images from National Geographic
 "Treasure of Nimrud rediscovered", article from The Wall Street Journal posted to a message board
 The Secret of Nimrud - Photographs by Noreen Feeney

 
14th-century BC establishments
Ancient Assyrian cities
Archaeological sites in Iraq
Articles containing video clips
Buildings and structures destroyed by ISIL
Destroyed cities
Former populated places in Iraq
Hebrew Bible cities
Nimrod
Nineveh Governorate
Populated places disestablished in the 7th century BC
Populated places established in the 2nd millennium BC